City Centre Deira is located in Dubai, United Arab Emirates, and is the original flagship mall in the Majid Al Futtaim Properties portfolio.

City Centre Deira opened on 28 November 1995. It is located in the older part of the city on cross road between Sharjah, Bur Dubai and the Airport. It is one of Majid Al Futtaim's Group mall chains and is similar in size and layout to the Mall of the Emirates in Dubai. It is a known shopping, entertainment and leisure complex with 3 levels. It has over 1.2 million sq. ft. of retail selling space, with 370 shops and 3,600 car-parking spaces. The mall's anchor stores include Carrefour, Debenhams, Iconic, Sharaf DG, Virgin Megastore, and Paris Gallery.

City Centre Deira is owned by the Majid Al Futtaim group, and is one of twelve City Centre malls — the others are located in Ajman, Alexandria, Cairo, Muscat, Fujairah, Qurum, Bahrain, Beirut and Sharjah.

Milestones

 1995: City Centre Deira opened
 2008: Food court renovated
 2011: Underwent redevelopment to open 55 new retail stores
 2013: Announced $6m redevelopment project to introduce new dining options and improved accessibility
 2014: City centre changes their logo

Redevelopment

In March 2013 City Centre Deira announced a US$5.9m redevelopment project. The redevelopment will upgrade the malls centre court, create easier metro access and an enhanced food court.

Shopping

City Centre Deira has over 370 stores. The malls anchor stores include Carrefour, Debenhams, Iconic, Sharaf DG, Virgin Megastore and Paris Gallery. There is a variety of electronics stores, cosmetic brands, toy stores, Jewellery Court and Textile Court at City Centre Deira. Retail Outlets are Debenhams, Plug-ins, Woolworths, Paris Gallery, and Virgin Megastore, Zara, Massimo Dutti and Hollister.

Dining
City Centre Deira houses over 58 restaurants, cafés and food outlets including Chili’s, Carluccio's, Coco’s, China Times, Hatam, P.F. Chang’s, Gazebo and Texas Roadhouse; and international Food Court with 21 outlets such as KFC, New York Fries, McDonald’s, Mrs Vanelli’s and Charley’s Grilled Subs, Chowking, Fat Burger & Baja Fresh.

Entertainment
 Magic Planet
Magic Planet is a family entertainment centre in the Middle East. It features the simulators, video games and theme rides for children.

 Bowling City
Bowling City is a cosmic bowling arena with 8 lanes, as well as billiards, internet and network games, karaoke, and a snack bar.

 VOX Cinemas
VOX Cinemas City Centre Deira is an 11-screen cinema multiplex with two 3D Digital RealD screens including Extreme Screen Digital screen cinema. VOX Cinemas is spread over 5,661 square meters with 2,795 seats and also features VOX Café.

Hotels
City Centre Deira is connected to four hotels including City Centre Hotel and Residence, managed by Accor Hotels; Novotel City Centre Deira; Ibis City Centre Deira, Pullman City Centre Deira and Aloft City Centre Deira.

Flora Park Deluxe Hotel Apartments which is just about 100 metres away from Deira City Centre. However, the hotel has been converted to a residential building in August 2020.

References

External links

City Centre Deira - Official Website

Shopping malls established in 1995
Shopping malls in Dubai